The Mexico–Puerto Rico boxing rivalry is a highly competitive sports rivalry that exists between male boxers from the country of Mexico and the Commonwealth of Puerto Rico, as well as their respective sets of fans. As of May 2022, Puerto Rico leads the rivalry in World Championship bouts 71-57-2, plus 2 No Contests. That includes Ultiminio Ramos, Oscar De la Hoya and Fernando Vargas as Mexicans, plus Kevin Kelley and Shakur Stevenson as Puerto Rican descent. Also includes 4 interims title bouts, but no minor titles, nor about 30 other fights between Puerto Ricans and fighters with Mexican heritage.

References
 

Boxing matches
History of boxing
Boxing in Puerto Rico
Boxing rivalries
Boxing in Mexico
Mexico–United States relations